Michael David Neu (born December 29, 1970) is an American football coach and former quarterback, who is the current head football coach of the Ball State Cardinals. He played college football at Ball State for Paul Schudel from 1990 to 1993 and played in the Canadian Football League (CFL) for one season and the Arena Football League (AFL) for 2 seasons from 1995 to 1997. He then served as the head coach of the af2's Augusta Stallions (2000), the AFL's Carolina Cobras (2001–2002) and the New Orleans VooDoo (2004–2008). In 2016, Neu returned to his alma mater, Ball State.

Early life and playing career
Born in Indianapolis, Indiana on December 29, 1970, Neu is the son of Gwyndoline and Ed Neu. He attended Perry Meridian High School in Indianapolis, where was the starting quarterback. He was named All-State as a senior in 1989. Neu grew up a fan of the University of Notre Dame. In 1990, Neu enrolled at Ball State University and played quarterback for the Cardinals, starting for four seasons. As a senior in 1993, he led Ball State to the Mid-American Conference (MAC) championship, was named the MAC MVP and Offensive Player of the Year.

Neu signed with the Calgary Stampeders of the Canadian Football League, where he served as a backup to Doug Flutie in 1995. In 1996, Neu signed with the Orlando Predators of the Arena Football League, where he spent the season as a backup to Pat O'Hara. He appeared in a single game for the Predators, throwing and rushing for touchdowns. The following year he signed with the Nashville Kats, but never appeared in a single game.

Coaching career 
In 1994, before pursuing a professional career, Neu would become a graduate assistant for Ball State.

From 1998 to 1999, he would remain with the Kats, but in the roles of quarterbacks coach and offensive coordinator respectfully. In 2000, he turned to the af2 as the head coach of the Augusta Stallions. Neu returned to the AFL ranks in 2001 as the offensive coordinator for the Carolina Cobras. When head coach Doug Kay resigned suddenly during the season, Neu was elevated to head coach of the Cobras, leading them to a Wild Card round loss to the Indiana Firebirds. After having the interim tag removed, Neu led the Cobras to the AFL Semifinals, where they lost to AFL runner-up, Arizona Rattlers. After taking a year off, Neu was named the head coach of the New Orleans VooDoo and led them to a 2004 South Division Title. During the 2006 AFL season, while the VooDoo suspended operations for the season, he worked as a professional scout for the National Football League's New Orleans Saints.

In 2014, Neu left his job as quarterbacks coach with the Tulane Green Wave football team, to take the same position with the Saints.

Neu was named the head coach at his alma mater Ball State on January 7, 2016. Neu was signed to a two-year extension in 2020. In the 2020 season, Mike Neu guided Ball State to their first bowl victory in school history defeating  the 19th ranked San Jose State Spartans by a score of 34-13 in the Arizona Bowl.

Personal
Neu has three children: Graycen, Carson, and Chase.

Head coaching record

Professional

College

References

External links
 Ball State profile
 AFL player stats
 AFL coaching stats

1970 births
Living people
American football quarterbacks
Augusta Stallions coaches
Ball State Cardinals football coaches
Ball State Cardinals football players
Carolina Cobras coaches
Nashville Kats coaches
New Orleans Saints coaches
New Orleans Saints scouts
New Orleans VooDoo coaches
Orlando Predators players
Tulane Green Wave football coaches
Coaches of American football from Indiana
Players of American football from Indianapolis
Players of Canadian football from Indianapolis